Liolaemus lenzi, Lenz’s iguana, is a species of lizard in the family Iguanidae.  It is found in Bolivia.

References

lenzi
Lizards of South America
Reptiles of Bolivia
Endemic fauna of Bolivia
Reptiles described in 1891
Taxa named by Oskar Boettger